Mount Calvary refers to:

 Calvary, the place where Jesus was crucified
 Sacred Mount Calvary of Domodossola, in Italy
 Mount Calvary, Wisconsin
 Mount Calvary Cemetery (Dubuque), a Roman Catholic cemetery in Dubuque, Iowa
 A Cornish language text "Passyon agan Arluth", edited for publication by Davies Gilbert as Mount Calvary